Titans/Young Justice: Graduation Day was a three-part comic book limited series published by DC Comics. It was written by Judd Winick and illustrated by Ale Garza (pencils) and Trevor Scott (inks).

Overview
Published early July to August 2003, it was a crossover event between the Titans and Young Justice, and would be the last time either of these teams would appear as both were dissolved at the series' end. The mini-series was used to set up the current Teen Titans and a new Outsiders ongoing series, introducing new Outsiders character Indigo and killing off one of the eldest Teen Titans characters, Omen, and began the resurrection of Metamorpho (the Metamorpho shown here is in fact "Shift", a new Metamorpho grown from a fragment of the original, but Metamopho did eventually return to challenge this duplicate some time later).

It was also retroactively tied into the Infinite Crisis event via DC Special: The Return of Donna Troy.

Plot
The story begins with Donna Troy having a dream where she is locked in constant battle; she is in fact seeing her "death" at the end of the story.

The story then begins proper with the fictional Optitron corporation offering to fund the Titans and/or Young Justice. Their sales pitch fails on the Titans because of Nightwing's impatience and Omen's ability to read minds, revealing their ulterior motive as a large tax write-off, though they do indeed want to help. Arsenal convinces Nightwing to wait and hear them out. The corporation (which is secretly owned by Batman's company Wayne Enterprises) would later fund Arsenal's Outsiders in the new Outsiders title that followed this series, which Nightwing would join.

Meanwhile, a mysterious robot, later revealed to be named Indigo, arrives in the DCU's present and begins to search out other cybernik lifeforms for help. After she accidentally destroys Platinum, Lead, and Iron of the Metal Men, she is led to Cyborg, one of the Titans' members and former New Teen Titans character, who is with the rest of the team and Young Justice at the Optitron corporation's building. But the Titans, specifically Argent, see Indigo's attempt to interface with Cyborg and use him to install a self-repair program (which was her intention in earlier scenes) as an attack, which causes the robot to switch into a defensive mode. A battle with Titans and Young Justice members ensues and leaves Argent and Empress hospitalized, Impulse injured, and Cyborg badly damaged. She then flees, badly damaged, and the injured super-heroes are rushed into a hospital at the start of the following issue.

The battle leaves Robin, Nightwing, and Wonder Girl questioning their team's and their own personal effectiveness. While the wounded heroes are tended to, Indigo attacks a S.T.A.R. Labs facility in Silicon Valley in desperate need of repair. She fights off the armed forces stationed there leading to her releasing a Superman robot that rampages, nearly destroying the facility. Responding to seeing the rampaging "Superman" on television, the remaining able-bodied Titans and Young Justice members (and Impulse, who is able to heal faster due to the Speed Force) confront the robot, thinking it to be Superman at first. When Lilith (who has met the real Superman before) cannot sense his thoughts, she approaches the robot, which breaks her neck, killing her instantly. The robot then badly injures Tempest.

The fight between the remaining heroes and the Superman robot encompasses nearly the whole of the third issue. The robot has all of Superman's abilities minus his invulnerability (though still very resilient) including ice breath, heat vision, flight, and super speed, making it more powerful than most of the characters fighting against it, and is shown to be faster than Impulse and Superboy and at least a match for Donna Troy. Of note, Nightwing acts as an "overall leader" during the fight, commanding the members of both teams. Donna is able to take the Superman robot away from the compound for a more even fight. While she, Superboy, and Nightwing battle it there, Indigo tells Arsenal and Robin that she can stop the robot and they can fix her. While they do, "Metamorpho" (in fact, Shift) returns. Presumably, he was in the same compound that the Superman robot was kept. The robot is fixed in time to stop the robot (with only one hit), but not fast enough to stop it from attacking Donna, whom it seemingly kills with its heat vision after she saves Nightwing from it and pummels it.

The series ends with a grand funeral for Donna (Omen's funeral was a quiet one that happened off panel) and the aftermath, which are two arguments. The first, between Robin, Superboy, and the incredibly disillusioned Wonder Girl, is the disbanding of Young Justice (Cyborg is seen looking, preempting the new Teen Titans series) and the second, between Arsenal and the incredibly disillusioned Nightwing, is the ending of the Titans. Many people are in attendance, including super-villain Angle Man, who previously became enamoured with Donna in the Wonder Woman comic. On another world, Donna awakens and heads into battle.

Lasting effects
 Young Justice and the Titans officially disbanded.
 Omen is killed leading into a later story in Teen Titans vol. 3, in which her zombie is chosen as the final mother of the third Brother Blood.
 Indigo and Shift are introduced into the DC Universe, setting up the full return of Metamorpho and the eventual The Insiders crossover between the Teen Titans and the Outsiders, which would also fully explain Superboy's origins, as well as Indigo's, seen in Teen Titans vol. 3, #24-26 and Outsiders vol. 3, #24-25, #28.

External links
 

DC Comics titles
DC Comics limited series
Teen Titans titles
Young Justice